Jung Jae-il (born 7 May 1982) is a South Korean music composer. He notably composed the score of award-winning movies Okja and Parasite, both directed by Bong Joon-ho, as well as the score of the television series Squid Game, the latter earned a nomination for Outstanding Original Main Title Theme Music in 74th Primetime Creative Arts Emmy Awards.

Biography 
He was three when he first sat on a piano, played the guitar at nine, and at age 13, he posted an ad on a music magazine called 'Hot music' "to find bass drums and vocals to do a style of music that is similar to the British heavy metalband Carcass." He graduated from Seoul Jazz Academy. He debuted as the bassist of the band gigs (which Jung wonyoung, vocalist Lee Juck and guitarist Han sangwon were also part of) in November 1999. He released his first solo album "tear flower(눈물꽃)" in 2003. He also was a member of band Puri in their second album in 2007.
He went to serve the military when he was at the age of 30 (around 2012 or 2013)  He played the piano at the April 2018 inter-Korean summit. In 2021,He won the 2021 Hollywood Music in Media Awards(HMMA) for his scores for the television series Squid Game.

Discography

Film composing

Television composing

Awards and nominations

References

External links
A namuwiki article about Jung Jae-Il (in Korean)
Jung Jae-Il's YouTube channel

1982 births
Living people
South Korean film score composers